Korahe is one of eleven Zones of the Somali Region of Ethiopia. Korahe is bordered on the southwest by the Gode, on the northwest by Fiq, on the north by Degehabur, on the east by Werder, and on the southeast by Somalia's federal state of Galmudug. The largest city in Korahe is Kebri Dahar. 

The gas fields of Calub and Hilala lie in this Zone, making local petrochemical extraction a potentially important industry.

Demographics 
Based on the 2007 Census conducted by the Central Statistical Agency of Ethiopia (CSA), this Zone has a total population of 901,028 of whom 463,211 are men and 437,817 women. While 47,607 or 20% are urban inhabitants, a further  265,106 or 80% were pastoralists. The largest ethnic group reported in Korahe were the Somalis (99.98%); all other ethnic groups made up 0.02% of the population. Somali language is spoken as a first language by 99.98%; the remaining 0.02% spoke all other primary languages reported. 98.92% of the population said they were Muslim.

The 1997 national census reported a total population for this Zone of 242,276 in 28,891 households, of whom 500,000-700,000 were men and 600,000- 700,000 were women; 37,226 or 15.37% of its population were urban dwellers. The largest ethnic group reported in Korahe was the Somali (98.75%); a similar proportion spoke Somali (99.13%) as their primary language. Only 14,256 or 5.88% were literate.

According to a May 24, 2004 World Bank memorandum, 2% of the inhabitants of Korahe have access to electricity, this zone has a road density of 6.1 kilometers per 1000 square kilometers, the average rural household has 0.7 hectare of land (compared to the national average of 1.01 hectare of land and an average of 2.25 for pastoral Regions) and the equivalent of 2.4 heads of livestock. 28.2% of the population is in non-farm related jobs, compared to the national average of 25% and an average of 28% for pastoral Regions. 18% of all eligible children are enrolled in primary school, and 4% in secondary schools. 100% of the zone is exposed to malaria, and none to Tsetse fly. The memorandum gave this zone a drought risk rating of 761.

Agriculture 

On 5–23 November 2003, the CSA conducted the first ever national agricultural census, of which the livestock census was an important component. For the Somali Region, the CSA generated estimated figures for the livestock population (cattle, sheep, goats, camels, and equids) and their distribution by commissioning an aerial survey. For the Korahe Zone, their results included:

Notes 

Somali Region
Zones of Ethiopia